Sornram Teppitak (also spelled as "Sornram Theppitak"; born August 22, 1973 in Thonburi side, Bangkok, Thailand or  nickname Num or Noom is a Thai actor and Thai pop singer after being a footballer. He has appeared in several notable lakorns, including: Dao pra sook with Suvanant Kongying which he played the role of Phak, Khun Poh Rub-Jang (Daddy for Hire) and Duang Jai Patiharn (Miracle of the Heart). He began acting at an adolescent age. His films include Garuda (Paksa wayu) and First Flight. He got Bachelor in Social Science from Ramkhamhaeng University. He was the highest paid Thai actor.

Personal life
In 2018, he married Kanitrin Patcharaphakdichoti in a simple wedding ceremony. On April 8, 2019, his wife gave birth to a girl named Veeji.

Filmography

Film

Dramas 

Ha Unlimited (Public) (2017)

Series

Sitcom

Special 
 Bury Burum (1992)
 Mrs. Slavery (1993)
 May Miya (1994)
Thong Lang Phra (2000)
 Maha Sanuk Shop (Sitcom) (2003)
 Battle of the Bones into the Lotus (Drama to honor) (2005)
 Is the bond of love (Drama to honor) (2007)
 Love Our House (drama to honor) (2008)
 12 brave heroes of Siam: Brahma the Great (Drama to honor) (2009)
 Closed behind the scenes at the highest dreams. (Drama to honor) (2009)
 The Three Sisters of Chaos (2011)

Ads 
 Brand Rollon
 Agfa
 Tamjai
 Hotta

Advertising

Master of Ceremony: MC ON TV

Business executive
 Executive, Rittiram Company Limited
 Managing Director: Ritthiram Co., Ltd.

Portfolio of books
 Polsaram books according to the regulations
 Pantry book

References

External links

 

1973 births
Living people
Sornram Teppitak
Sornram Teppitak
Sornram Teppitak
Sornram Teppitak
Sornram Teppitak
Male telenovela actors
Sornram Teppitak
Sornram Teppitak
Sornram Teppitak
Thai television personalities
Sornram Teppitak
Sornram Teppitak
Sornram Teppitak